Sheikh Rashid  bin Ahmad Al Mualla‎ (1932 – January 2, 2009) was the ruler or head of state of Umm Al Quwain from 1981 to 2009. His reign commenced when he succeeded his father, Sheikh Ahmad bin Rashid Al Mualla on February 21, 1981.

He died on January 2, 2009, in London. A week-long national mourning was declared, and flags flew at half staff during that period. His son Saud bin Rashid Al Mualla succeeding his father, became the ruler of Umm Al Quwain on January 2, 2009.

References

1932 births
2009 deaths
Sheikhs of Umm Al Quwain
History of the United Arab Emirates
20th-century Emirati people